Roy Levien is among the all-time most prolific inventors in the world as measured by U.S utility patents, with over 737 issued and more than 1,260 US patent applications. He is also the recipient of the Microsoft Chairman's Award from Bill Gates in 1990 for his work on applications architecture and the foundations of ActiveX. Levien co-authored the book The Keystone Advantage: What the New Dynamics of Business Ecosystems Mean for Strategy, Innovation, and Sustainability.

Levien received an M.A. in Biology from Yale University, an A.B. in Applied Mathematics from Harvard College, and has attended the doctoral programs at the Harvard Business School and Cornell's department of Neurobiology and Behavior.

References

21st-century American inventors
Harvard College alumni
Cornell University alumni
Yale University alumni
Living people
Year of birth missing (living people)